Iron Commando is a belt-scrolling beat 'em up video game  for the Super Nintendo Entertainment System by French developer Arcade Zone. It was scheduled to be released in Europe by Sony Electronic Publishing (who also published Arcade Zone's previous title, Legend) sometime between 1994 and 1995, but was cancelled after Sony discontinued its third-party publishing business on the Super NES in order to focus on the PlayStation, leaving the title orphaned without a publisher.

Piko Interactive ended up acquiring the international publishing rights to Iron Commando, initially releasing the game digitally on Steam in 2016, before eventually producing a reproduction cartridge for the Super NES in 2017. BlazePro also produced a reproduction the Super Famicom version for the Japanese market during the same year.

Gameplay
A soldier named Jack and a kung-fu master named Chang Li are the Iron Commando field team. They must cross ten different environments to save the world, fighting against punks, gunfighters, knights and any kind of strange creatures.

Reception
Famitsu gave the SFC version a 20/40.

References

External links 
 Iron Commando at MobyGames
 Before You Play at steamcommunity.com

1995 video games
Arcade Zone games
Beat 'em ups
Multiplayer and single-player video games
Piko Interactive games
Super Nintendo Entertainment System games
Video games developed in France
Windows games